Moods of Marvin Gaye is the seventh studio album by Marvin Gaye, released on the Tamla label in 1966.

The album was the result of a plan to establish Gaye as a strong album-oriented artis as well as a hit maker. Gaye was still uncomfortable with performing strictly R&B and had begun work on a standards album around this time after meeting musician Bobby Scott. However, the sessions were unsuccessful and he would successfully complete a standards album only in his later years (released posthumously as Vulnerable in 1997). For the time being, Gaye was winning more fans and had become a crossover teen idol. Six songs from Moods of Marvin Gaye were released as singles: impressively, all reached the Top 40 on the R&B singles chart and four of them reached the Top 40 on the Pop Singles Chart, a rare feat for a solo R&B artist even at that time.

Gaye also scored his first two #1 R&B singles, "I'll Be Doggone" and "Ain't That Peculiar", both co-written by Gaye's friend, Berry Gordy's right-hand man Smokey Robinson.

Track listing

Personnel
Marvin Gaye - lead vocals
The Andantes - backing vocals (all of side 1; side 2, tracks 8-10)
The Miracles - additional backing vocals (on "I'll Be Doggone")
The Spinners - backing vocals (on "Hey Diddle Diddle")
Marv Tarplin - guitar (side 1, tracks 1, 3, 5 and 6)
The Funk Brothers - instrumentation

1966 albums
Marvin Gaye albums
Tamla Records albums
Albums produced by Clarence Paul
Albums produced by Brian Holland
Albums produced by Lamont Dozier
Albums recorded at Hitsville U.S.A.
Albums produced by Smokey Robinson
Albums arranged by Paul Riser